Enric Marco (12 April 1921 – 21 May 2022) was a Catalonian impostor who claimed to have been a prisoner in Nazi German concentration camps Mauthausen and Flossenbürg in World War II.  He was awarded the Creu de Sant Jordi by the Catalan government in 2001 and wrote a book on his experiences.  In 2005 he admitted his claims were false and returned his medal, after his deception was revealed by university researcher Benito Bermejo.

Marco was born in Barcelona on 12 April 1921. He told Catalan TV: "I wasn't in a concentration camp. I was held in captivity and the Nazis did impose penalties on me. But that does not exonerate me from being an impostor." He said he was released after being mistreated for several weeks and returned to Spain in 1943. Marco claimed he had volunteered in 1941 to work in Kiel for the Nazi war industry. In his made-up story called Memoir of Hell Marco wrote he had been involved in the French resistance and captured by the Gestapo in southern France.

After 2001 Marco represented an association of survivors of the thousands of Spaniards who had truly been deported to Nazi concentration camps.

From 1978 to 1979, Marco, a metal worker, had been the General Secretary of the Spanish anarchist Union CNT (Confederación Nacional del Trabajo), from which he was expelled in 1980.

Marco died on 21 May 2022, at the age of 101.

Popular culture
 "Ich bin Enric Marco" directed by Santiago Fillol and Lucas Vermal, produced by Corte y Confección de películas

Bibliography
 Memorias del infierno, (Memories or Memoir of Hell) by Enric Marco, 1978. Spanish.
 El impostor by Javier Cercas - (2014,  Penguin Random House Grupo Editorial, Spain)

See also
 Misha Defonseca
 Martin Grey
 Herman Rosenblat
 Rosemarie Pence
 Binjamin Wilkomirski
 Javier Cercas

References

External links
 The Times, 14 May 2005.
 Times online. [Forced redirect]

Impostors
1921 births
2022 deaths
Hoaxes in Spain
People from Catalonia
Anarchists from Catalonia
Secretaries General of the Confederación Nacional del Trabajo